Epidendrum minarum  is a species of orchid of the genus Epidendrum. This is an epiphytic orchid occurring in Brazil.

References 

minarum
Epiphytic orchids
Orchids of Brazil